Coaticook is a town on the Coaticook River in southeastern Quebec, Canada. It is the seat of the Coaticook Regional County Municipality, and its southern border is also the Canada–United States border.

In addition to the primary community of Coaticook, smaller communities that are now within the municipal boundaries include Baldwin's Mills, Barnston, Ladd's Mills and Stanhope, the last of which was a separate community in the 1890s and used to have the small private Stanhope Airport.

Name 
The municipality is named after the Coaticook River. The name “Coaticook” is of Abenaki origin, deriving from the term “koatikeku”, which means “where the river is bordered by white pines”.

History
The place was founded in 1818. Richard Baldwin Senior, from Barnston Pinacle cleared a parcel of land where later the City Hall was built. Richard Baldwin son, built the first permanent residence at this place. The area of the Townships of Barnston and Barford was settled in the 1820s and the 1830s by British Loyalists and Americans, mainly from New England. The municipality was finally incorporated in 1864. After the merger of the municipalities of Barnston Township and Barford Township on December 12, 1998, the surface area of the newly-created municipality increased considerably.

Coaticook now extends over a total land area of 218.89 square kilometres and the 108 animal farms within its territory, including 66 dairy farms, make it one of Quebec's major milk producers. Coaticook is dubbed the Pearl of the Eastern Townships.

Demographics 

Mother tongue:
 English as first language: 4.5%
 French as first language: 95.1%
 English and French as first language: 0.3%
 Other as first language: <0.1%

Economy

Dairy industry

Residing in the administrative region of Estrie, the dairy industry plays an important role in the economy of Coaticook and the surrounding regions. One of Coaticook's most renowned and important attractions is the Laiterie de Coaticook. Founded in 1940 by Arthur Bédard, Arthur St-Cyr, and Henri Gérin, the Laiterie initially prepared, bottled, and distributed pasteurized dairy products such as milk, chocolate milk, and cream. Only two years later did the Laiterie begin the production of its quickly-famed ice cream and cheddar cheese. 
In 1976, under the new administration of Fernand Houle and Émile Provencher, the Laiterie chose to halt the distribution of milk, chocolate milk, and cream. These specializations permitted the Laiterie to position itself firmly on the market. Over the next 50 years, the Laiterie expanded its product range, adding new flavors of ice cream, goat cheese, "Bûche de Noël" cakes, and several other products. Today, still relying on one manufactory, its products are sold province-wide and in New Brunswick.

Cemeteries
Cemeteries in or near Coaticook include Mount Forest Cemetery, Saint Edmond Cemetery, St-Luc and St-Wilfrid-de-Barnston.

Climate

Sports
Coaticook is home to the Coaticook Big Bill of the Ligue de Baseball Senior Élite du Québec, which play their home games in Julien Morin Stadium.

Gallery

See also
Grand Trunk Station (Coaticook)
Norton–Stanhope Border Crossing

References

External links

  Ville de Coaticook

Cities and towns in Quebec
Incorporated places in Estrie
Coaticook Regional County Municipality